Angel Sotirov (born 16 October 1943) is a Bulgarian wrestler. He competed in the men's freestyle 78 kg at the 1968 Summer Olympics.

References

External links
 

1943 births
Living people
Bulgarian male sport wrestlers
Olympic wrestlers of Bulgaria
Wrestlers at the 1968 Summer Olympics
Sportspeople from Burgas